Niphargus elegans is a species of amphipod crustaceans in the family Niphargidae. It is found in Italy.

References 

Niphargidae
Crustaceans described in 1894